Horst von Möllendorff (26 April 1906 – 17 December 1992) was a German cartoonist who was "drafted" to work for the Nazis' animated short industry. He was hired as a result of former commercial animator Hans Fischerkoesen not being able to come up with adequate story ideas for his short films. Horst was pulled from his job as a popular Berlin newspaper cartoonist to become a gagman for the animation industry.

Möllendorff received authorship for at least three films: 
 Verwitterte Melodie (Weather-beaten Melody), 1942
 Der Schneemann (The Snowman), 1943
 Hochzeit im Korallenmeer (Wedding in the Coral Sea), 1945

References

External links
 Lambiek Comiclopedia article.

1906 births
1992 deaths
Nazi propagandists
German animators
German comics artists
German cartoonists